The Ulster Senior Schoolgirls' Cup is an annual competition competed for by schools affiliated to the Ulster Hockey Association, a branch of the Irish Hockey Association. The competition has been in existence since 1907 and is currently sponsored by the Belfast Telegraph.

Since 1980, the winners have qualified to represent Ulster in the Kate Russell All-Ireland Schools Hockey Cup.

The most successful school is Methodist College Belfast with 21 wins (18 outright wins and 3 shared wins). The current holder is The Royal School, Armagh.

Trophy

The trophy is a small silver cup mounted on a plinth on a wooden shield.

Format 

The competition is run through an open draw format. The first round is held in November, progressing through to a showpiece final held in early March. The final attracts a crowd of roughly 1000 people, which is large for an attendance at a hockey match in Ulster.

Current season 

The Royal School, Armagh, captained by Anna McKew, defeated Strathearn 2-0 in the final played at Stormont. The victory meant The Royal School completed a league and cup double.

Performance table

FINALS

1900s

1910s

1920s

1930s

1940s

1950s

1960s

1970s

1980s

1990s

2000s

2010s

2020s

Sources

Field hockey competitions in Ulster
Women's field hockey cup competitions in Ireland
1907 establishments in Ireland